Greatest Hits 1974–78 is a compilation album by the Steve Miller Band released in November 1978, presenting the band's hits from 1973–1977.

Content
The album features the title track from 1973's The Joker plus 13 tracks taken from Fly Like an Eagle (1976) and Book of Dreams (1977).  As a sign of the album-oriented rock times, all but one track came from their last two albums even though they had eleven studio albums at the time.  The shorter 7-inch single versions of "Jet Airliner", "Swingtown", "The Joker", and "Fly Like an Eagle" are featured on this compilation.

Track listing

A U.S. cassette version of the album manufactured by Capitol Records omits four of the above tracks: "Serenade" and "The Stake" on side A, and "Threshold" and "Dance, Dance, Dance" from Side B; the order of the tracks remains the same.

All selections published by Sailor Music, except "The Joker" by Sailor Music/Unichappel Music, Inc. and "Jet Airliner" by Sailor Music/No Thought Music.

Personnel
 Steve Miller – synthesizer, guitar, keyboards, vocals, producer, compilation producer
 David Denny – guitar, rhythm guitar
 Greg Douglass – guitar, slide guitar
 John McFee – Dobro
 Bob Glaub – bass guitar
 Gerald Johnson – bass guitar
 Lonnie Turner – bass guitar
 Byron Allred – synthesizer, piano, keyboards
 Joachim Jymm Young – Hammond organ
 Dickie Thompson – organ, clavinet
 Norton Buffalo – harmonica on tracks 7 and 13
 John King – drums
 Gary Mallaber – percussion, drums

Production
 Roberta Ballard – production manager
 Mike Fusaro – engineer
 Jim Gaines – engineer, mixing
 Gene Hicks – assistant engineer, mixing assistant
 Steve Hoffman – remastering
 Win Kutz – mixing assistant
 Marcia McGovern – pre-production
 John Palladino – executive producer
 Jay Ranellucci – engineer, mixing

Artwork and design
 Kelley and Mouse – Cover illustration & design
 Sam Shepard – cover lettering
 David Stahl – photography
 John Van Hamersveld – design

Charts

Weekly charts

Year-end charts

Certification

See also
List of best-selling albums in the United States

References

1978 greatest hits albums
Steve Miller Band compilation albums
Capitol Records compilation albums